The Pongo de Manseriche is a gorge in northwest Peru. The Marañón River runs through this gorge (and water gap) before it reaches the Amazon Basin.

The Pongo de Manseriche was first discovered (by Europeans) by the Spanish Adelantado and conqueror Juan de Salinas y Loyola. He fitted out an expedition at Loja in Ecuador, descended the Rio Santiago to the Marañón, passed through the Pongo in 1557 and invaded the country of the Maina Indians. Later, the missionaries of Cajamarca and Cusco established many missions in the Maynas, and made extensive use of the Pongo de Manseriche as an avenue of communication with their several convents on the Andean plateau. There is an ancient tradition of the indigenous people of the vicinity that one of their gods descended the Marañón and another ascended the Amazon to communicate with him. They opened the pass called the Pongo de Manseriche.

External links

Canyons and gorges of Peru
Landforms of Amazonas Region
Water gaps